Magnifique was an 86-gun Bucentaure-class 80-gun ship of the line of the French Navy, designed by Sané.

She was commissioned in Lorient on 1 November 1814.

She had an uneventful career, with a refit in 1831, before being broken up in December 1837.

References
 Jean-Michel Roche, Dictionnaire des Bâtiments de la flotte de guerre française de Colbert à nos jours, tome I

 

Ships of the line of the French Navy
Ships built in France
Bucentaure-class ships of the line
1814 ships